By the arrangements of the Canadian federation, Canada's monarchy operates in Ontario as the core of the province's Westminster-style parliamentary democracy. As such, the Crown within Ontario's jurisdiction may be referred to as the Crown in Right of Ontario, His Majesty in Right of Ontario, the King in Right of Ontario, or His Majesty the King in Right of Ontario.  The Constitution Act, 1867, leaves many functions in Ontario specifically assigned to the sovereign's viceroy, the lieutenant governor of Ontario, whose direct participation in governance is limited by the constitutional conventions of constitutional monarchy.

Constitutional role

The role of the Crown is both legal and practical; it functions in Ontario in the same way it does in all of Canada's other provinces, being the centre of a constitutional construct in which the institutions of government acting under the sovereign's authority share the power of the whole. It is thus the foundation of the executive, legislative, and judicial branches of the province's government. The —is represented and his duties carried out by the lieutenant governor of Ontario, whose direct participation in governance is limited by the conventional stipulations of constitutional monarchy, with most related powers entrusted for exercise by the elected parliamentarians, the ministers of the Crown generally drawn from among them, and the judges and justices of the peace. The Crown today primarily functions as a guarantor of continuous and stable governance and a nonpartisan safeguard against the abuse of power.

This arrangement began with the 1867 British North America Act and continued an unbroken line of monarchical government extending back to the early 17th century. Though it has its own government headed by the King, as a province, Ontario is not itself a kingdom.

There is currently no government house in Ontario. A viceregal suite in the Ontario Legislative Building in Toronto is used both as an office and official event location by the lieutenant governor, the sovereign, and other members of the royal family. The lieutenant governor resides in their own private residence, though may be provided accommodations by the provincial government if they are not from Toronto. The King and his relations reside at a hotel, usually the Fairmont Royal York, when in Toronto.

Royal associations

Those in the royal family perform ceremonial duties when on a tour of the province; the royal persons do not receive any personal income for their service, only the costs associated with the exercise of these obligations are funded by both the Canadian and Ontario Crowns in their respective councils. Monuments around Ontario mark some of those visits, while others honour a royal personage or event. Further, Ontario's monarchical status is illustrated by royal names applied regions, communities, schools, and buildings, many of which may also have a specific history with a member or members of the royal family; for example, Ontario has at least 47 distinct features named for Queen Victoria: one county, one township, 14 populated places, and 31 physical features. Associations also exist between the Crown and many private organizations within the province; these may have been founded by a royal charter, received a royal prefix, and/or be honoured with the patronage of a member of the royal family. Examples include the Royal Hamilton Yacht Club, which is under the patronage of Charles III and received its royal designation from Queen Victoria in 1891, and the Royal Conservatory of Music in Toronto, which, though founded in 1886, was constituted through royal charter by King George VI in 1947.

The main symbol of the monarchy is the sovereign himself, his image (in portrait or effigy) thus being used to signify government authority. A royal cypher or crown may also illustrate the monarchy as the locus of authority, without referring to any specific monarch. Further, though the monarch does not form a part of the constitutions of Ontario's honours, they do stem from the Crown as the fount of honour and, so, bear on the insignia symbols of the sovereign.

History

The history of the monarchy in Ontario dates back to the 17th century, with French explorers claiming Ontario as a part of New France, a colony established in the name of the king of France. Charles II of England later established Rupert's Land, a large territory that included northern Ontario by royal proclamation. Following the British conquest of New France in 1760, the western Pays d'en Haut (including most of southern Ontario) remained a part of the British province of Quebec.

Following the American Revolutionary War, some 46,000 American settlers loyal to the Crown, known as the United Empire Loyalists, fled north to Quebec, and other British colonies. The King-in-Council granted each family  of land.  In addition to the Loyalists, thousands of Iroquois and other Aboriginals were expelled from New York and other states, resettling under the protection of the Crown in what is now Ontario. A few dozen Black Loyalists also settled in Ontario, although the majority of Black Loyalists settled in Nova Scotia. The majority of black habitants of Ontario were slaves brought into the colony the American loyalists.

As a result of this population influx in the aftermath of the Revolutionary War, the western portions of Quebec was severed, forming the new province of Upper Canada in 1791. Upper Canada was reunited with its eastern portion (Lower Canada) to create the Province of Canada, with the enactment of the Act of Union 1840. The province of Ontario was created from the boundaries of Canada West following Canadian Confederation in 1867. Several areas were incorporated into Ontario in the mid 19th and early 20th century, with Ontario reaching its final size in 1912.

See also
 List of royal tours to Hamilton, Ontario
 List of royal tours to London, Ontario
 Monarchy in the Canadian provinces
 Symbols of Ontario

References

External links
 The Monarchy in Ontario, from the Archives of Ontario
 

Ontario, Monarchy in
Politics of Ontario
Westminster system